Stagmatophora basanistis is a moth in the  family Cosmopterigidae. It is found in South Africa.

References

Natural History Museum Lepidoptera generic names catalog

Endemic moths of South Africa
Cosmopteriginae
Moths of Africa
Moths described in 1909